Thymectacin (NB-1011, NB-101) is an experimental anticancer prodrug of brivudine monophosphate. It is being developed by New Biotics and it entered in phase I clinical trials for colon cancer in 2006.

Thymectacin is a small molecule phosphoramidate derivative of (E)-5-(2-bromovinyl)-2'-deoxyuridine (BVdU) with potential antineoplastic activity.  It is selectively active against tumor cells expressing high levels of thymidylate synthase (TS). Thymectacin is converted intracellularly by TS to bromovinyldeoxyuridine monophosphate (BVdUMP) which competes with the natural substrate, deoxyuridine monophosphate, for binding to TS. Unlike TS inhibitors, this agent is a reversible substrate for TS catalysis. Thus, TS retains activity and converts BVdUMP into cytotoxic metabolites.

References 

Pyrimidinediones
Tetrahydrofurans
Phosphoramidates
Amino acid derivatives
Methyl esters